Mohammed Bey or M'hamed Bey (18 September 1811 – 22 September 1859) was the eleventh Husainid Bey of Tunis, ruling from 1855 until his death. He was the son of Al-Husayn II ibn Mahmud and his second wife Lalla Fatima al-Munastiri.

As Bey al-Mahalla (Heir Apparent) he had been awarded the rank of divisional general in the Ottoman army in August 1840, and was raised to the rank of marshal on 7 August 1855, shortly after he succeeded his cousin Ahmad Bey on 30 May 1855. He retained his predecessor's key minister Mustapha Khaznadar as Grand vizier and surrounded himself with competent ministers such as Kheireddine Pacha and Generals Hussain and Rustum as well as devoted counsellors including Mohamed Bayram IV, Mahmoud Kabadou and Ismaïl Caïd Essebsi.

After his accession he proceeded with reforms, including, on 10 September 1857, the Fundamental Pact which recognised religious freedom and equality before the law for all inhabitants of the country, regardless of their religion. In a decree of 30 August 1858, he established the first modern municipal government for the city of Tunis.

He considerably extended and embellished the Dar al-Taj palace in La Marsa, stripping the old Mohammedia Palace favoured by his predecessor of building materials to do so.

He died after only four years on the throne and was buried in the Tourbet el Bey in the Medina of Tunis.

References 

1811 births
1859 deaths
Beys of Tunis
Tunisian royalty